Cytaeum or Kytaion was a town on the north coast of ancient Crete. It is mentioned by Ptolemy, Pliny the Elder, Nonnus, and Stephanus of Byzantium.

The site of Cytaeum is tentatively located near modern Almyrida.

References

Populated places in ancient Crete
Former populated places in Greece